Wusha is a town of Guichi District, Chizhou, Anhui, China. , it administers Wusha Residential Community, Yantang Residential Community, and the following twelve villages:
Xinzhuang Village
Lianzhuang Village
Fengzhuang Village
Hengtang Village
Xinyi Village
Liyang Village
Longgan Village
Dengta Village
Liancun Village
Hongzhuang Village
Lianhua Village
Shuangtang Village

See also
List of township-level divisions of Anhui

References

Towns in Anhui
Chizhou